Kevin Mattson (born 1966) is an American historian and critic. Mattson received his B.A. from the New School and his Ph.D. from the University of Rochester. For several years he ran the Walt Whitman Center for the Culture and Politics of Democracy at Rutgers University,

He is the Connor Study Professor of Contemporary History at Ohio University. He is a fellow at the Center for American Progress and on the editorial board of Dissent.

He has received College of Arts & Sciences award for the Outstanding Faculty Research and Scholarship in the Social Sciences 2013–2014.

Works 
 Creating a Democratic Public: The Struggle for Urban Participatory Democracy During the Progressive Era (diss., 1998)
 Intellectuals in Action: The Origins of the New Left and Radical Liberalism, 1945-1970 (2002)
 Engaging Youth: Combating the Apathy of Young Americans Toward Politics (2003)
 Upton Sinclair and the Other American Century (2006)
 When America Was Great: The Fighting Faith of Liberalism in Post-War America (2004, 2nd ed. 2006)
 Rebels All!: A Short History of the Conservative Mind in Postwar America (2008)
 What the Heck Are You Up To Mr. President?: Jimmy Carter, America's Malaise and the Speech That Should Have Changed the Country (2009)
 Just Plain Dick: Richard Nixon's Checkers Speech and the 'Rocking, Socking' Election of 1952 (2012)
 We're Not Here to Entertain: Punk Rock, Ronald Reagan, and the Real Culture War of 1980s America (2020)

Edited books
 Steal This University: The Rise of the Corporate University and the Academic Labor Movement, ed. with Benjamin Johnson and Patrick Kavanagh (2003)
 Liberalism for a New Century , ed. with Neil Jumonville (2007)
 Democracy's Moment : Reforming the American Political System for the 21st Century ed. with Ronald Hayduk (2002)
 The Cause: The Fight for American Liberalism from Franklin Roosevelt to Barack Obama with Eric Alterman (2012)

Other writings
 Mattson's articles in The American Prospect
 Mattson's articles in Dissent
 Mattson's articles in Democracy Journal

Notes

External links 
 Mattson's personal website
 Mattson's blog

21st-century American historians
21st-century American male writers
Ohio University faculty
The New School alumni
1966 births
American male non-fiction writers
Living people
Historians from New York (state)